Haron may refer to:
Haron Amin, Afghan politician
Haron Keitany, Kenyan athlete
Haron Koech, Kenyan hurdler
Haron Shakava, Kenyan footballer
Idris Haron, Malaysian politician
Ismail Haron, Singaporean singer
Tiago Haron, Brazilian footballer

See also
Anna t'Haron, Russian pianist